Indirect elections for the o le Ao o le Malo (head of state) were held in Samoa on 5 July 2017. Tuimalealiʻifano Vaʻaletoʻa Sualauvi II was the only candidate, and was elected unopposed. He had been nominated by Prime Minister Tuila'epa Sa'ilele Malielegaoi.

References

Elections in Samoa
Samoa
O le Ao o le Malo election
Uncontested elections